The Free Fall is a 2021 American horror drama film directed by Adam Stilwell, starring Andrea Londo, Shawn Ashmore and Jane Badler.

Cast
 Andrea Londo as Sarah
 Shawn Ashmore as Nick
 Jane Badler as Rose
 Michael Berry Jr. as Tom
 Elizabeth Cappuccino as Julie
 Dominic Hoffman as Dr. Sims
 Lorenzo Antonucci as Bobby
 Marc Senter as Marc
 Nathaniel Peterson as Nathaniel
 Madeleine Coghlan as Madeline
 Diane Ayala Goldner as Veiled Woman
 Jackie Dallas as Annette
 Samuel Davis as Kevin

Release
The film premiered at the Grimmfest Film Festival on 7 October 2021.

Reception
Sharai Bohannon of Dread Central rated the film 5 stars out of 5 and called it "equal parts haunting, disturbing, and beautiful."

Jenn Adams of Rue Morgue called the film a "haunting and relentless journey through a beautiful nightmare".

Alex Sakaliev of Film Threat gave the film a score of 5/10 and praised Kniest's "smooth, long tracking shots and exquisite framing complement the beautiful lighting and set design", as well as the performances of Londo and Ashmore. However, he criticised the "amateurish" dialogue, the "cheap shock scares" and the "over-abundance of (and reliance on) jarring flashbacks and dream sequences".

References

External links
 
 

2021 films
American horror drama films
2020s horror drama films